Jan Joost van Cossiau (1662–c.1732) was a Flemish landscape painter and engraver. Jan was born in Roeselare, Belgium 30 August 1662, first son of the local GP Judocus Cossiau, and Jacoba de Burchgrave. He was baptised as Carolus Jacobus Cossiau, after his maternal grandfather who was his godfather. However, Cossiau must have been called Jan after his paternal grandfather who died a few months before his birth, but traditionally would have been his godfather otherwise.  He spent most of his career in Frankfurt am Main. In Germany his sister Isabella lived with him, most likely as housekeeper/maid.  His landscapes usually include people, and also often buildings and cattle.  They are in the “Italian style” and generally resemble those of Gaspard Dughet (1613–1675).  Cossiau worked for Lothar Franz von Schönborn at his electoral court, as well as at his Schloss Weißenstein (castle). He was also director of the electoral gallery at Pommersfelden, where he established the final directory of paintings, after the first survey by Johann Rudolph Bys. In order to extend his gallery, Lothar Franz sent his two gallery directors often to the Netherlands and Italy. Jan Joost van Cossiau died around 1732, maybe around Mainz.

References
 Bauereisen, Hildegard, Der kurmainzische Hofmaler Jan Joost van Cossiau, ein spätbarocker Landschaftsmaler, New York, P. Lang, 1986.
 Bott, Katharina, Jan Joost Van Cossiau: Delitiae Imaginum, Oder Wohl-Erlaubte Gemahlde Und Bilder-Lust Die Gemaldesammlung Des Lothar Franz Von Schonborn in Schloss Gaibach/Unterfranken Die Gemaldekatalog Von Jan Joost Van Cossiau Aus Dem Jahre 1721, Weimar, VDG, 2000.
 Bryan, Michael, Robert Edmund Graves, Walter Armstrong, Dictionary of Painters and Engravers, G. Bell and Sons, 1886, 315.
 Thieme, Ulrich and Felix Becker, Allgemeines Lexikon der bildenden Künstler von der Antike bis zur Gegenwart, Reprint of 1907 edition, Leipzig, Veb E.A. Seemann Verlag, 1980–1986.

Gallery

Footnotes

External links
 Getty Union List of Artists Names

1732 deaths
17th-century Flemish painters
18th-century Flemish painters
Flemish landscape painters
17th-century German people
18th-century German people
German people of Flemish descent
1662 births